The following is a list of prominent Upper Canada College (UCC) alumni; many notable men are graduates of the school. UCC's alumni are usually known simply as Old Boys (as is common with most all-male private schools). They include:

Academia
 Arthur, James Greig (1962) world's leading mathematician in representation theory and creator of the General Trace Formula
 Assikinack, Francis (1848)  Ojibwe historian and treaty negotiator
 Bethune, Charles James Stewart (1856) Headmaster of Trinity College School; co-founder of Entomological Society of Canada
 Biggar, James H.  (1926) founder of Visites Interprovinviales, later the Society for Educational Visits and Exchanges in Canada
 Clarkson, Stephen  (1954) foreign policy and Canadian history expert and Governor General's Award winner, ex-husband of Adrienne Clarkson.
 Cooper, John Julius, 2nd Viscount Norwich  (1942) British historian, travel writer, and television personality
 Crean, John Gale (1932) founding President of the Ontario Science Centre and the first Canadian director of International Chamber of Commerce
 Crooks, Adam first Chancellor of the University of Toronto and Attorney General of Canada
 Cruikshank, Ernest Alexander (1872) Canadian historian and founder of the Ontario Historical Society
 Denison, George Taylor III  (1856) founder of Canada First and the Canadian National Association
 Eayrs, James (1938)  political scientist; Governor General's Award winner
 Eksteins, Modris  (1961) historian of Germany
 Endicott, Timothy (1979) first Dean of Law, University of Oxford
 Ewart, John S.  lawyer, Canadian historian, and advocate of Canadian independence
 Fleming, James Henry (1892) ornithologist
 Grant, George P.  (1936) philosopher and author
 Grier, Terry (c. 1954) President of Ryerson University and New Democratic Party member of parliament
 Hayhurst, Jim (1959) Chairman of Outward Bound, member of the Canadian Mount Everest expedition; co-founder of Trails Youth Initiatives
 Hayhurst, Jim Jr. (1987) member of the Canadian Mount Everest expedition
 Ignatieff, Nicholas warden of Hart House, at the University of Toronto
 Jennings, William Tyndale – civil engineer, city engineer for Toronto, and President of the Canadian Society of Civil Engineers (later the Engineering Institute of Canada)
 Keefer, Thomas (1838) aquatics civil engineer, president of the American Society of Civil Engineers, and founder of the Canadian Society for Civil Engineering
 Kilbourn, William  (c. 1946) author, historian, and executive of the Canada Council and Canadian commission for UNESCO
 Kilbourn, William Morley (1944) Toronto historian and first president of The Word on the Street
 Loudin, James  (1858) first physics professor at the University of Toronto and president of the Royal Society of Canada
 MacInnis, Dr. Joseph  (1956) explorer, leader of the dive to film the RMS Titanic in IMAX, and the first person to dive under the North Pole
 Macklem, Michael  founder of Oberon Press
 McNaught, Kenneth  (c. 1936) historian and author
 Parmenter, Ross (1929) music editor at the New York Times and expert on indigenous Mexican culture
 Patterson, John Andrew – President of the Astronomical and Physical Society of Toronto and prominent lawyer
 Ryerson, Stanley Bréhaut (c. 1929) historian and communist activist
 Singer, Peter (1978) Director of Joint Centre for Bioethics at the University of Toronto and programme director at the Canadian Program on Genomics
 Stupart, Sir Robert Fredrick (1872) pioneer of public weather forecasts; director of the National Meteorological Society
 Tyrell, Joseph  (1878) discoverer of dinosaur bones in Alberta and in whose honour the Royal Tyrrell Museum of Palaeontology is named
 Wright, Sir Charles Seymour (1904) team physicist on Robert Scott's Antarctic expedition and developer of the "trench wireless" during World War I

Arts and media

Literature and journalism
 Bacque, James author
 Black, Conrad, Baron Black of Crossharbour  (did not graduate) author, newspaper baron
 Bruce, Addington (c. 1892) journalist and American historian
 Chewitt, William Cameron (c. 1846) Canadian publisher; one of the first two members of the University of Toronto to graduate in medicine
 Colapinto, John (c. 1977) award-winning journalist, novelist and staff writer for The New Yorker
 Davies, Robertson  (1932) author, playwright, and journalist
 Fraser, Graham (c. 1964) Canadian journalist and languages commissioner of Canada
 Fraser, John  (1963) Editor of Saturday Night Magazine; master of Massey College
 Gilmour, David (1968) journalist, novelist, winner of the Governor General's Award for English-language fiction
 Glazebrook, G.P. de T. (George Parkin de Twenebroker)  Canadian historian
 Heintzman, Andrew (1986) founder and editor of Shift magazine
 Leacock, Stephen  (1882) writer and economist
 Macklem, Michael  (1946) founder and owner of Oberon Press
 MacLean, Rory  (1954) writer and broadcaster
 Newman, Peter C.  (1947) Peabody Award-winning journalist; former editor of Macleans and the Toronto Star
 Robertson, John Ross (1850) journalist and founder of Toronto Evening Telegram, in whose honour John Ross Robertson Public School is named
 Scadding, Henry (1833) educator, rector, and writer
 Stackhouse, John (1981) author; editor of The Globe and Mail
 Steiner, Robert (1987) - Director of Munk School Fellowship in Journalism at University of Toronto
 Symons, Thomas  (1942) founding president of Trent University and Canadian studies author

 Walker, Alan executive editor of Maclean's magazine

Music and radio
 Cuddy, Jim (1974) founder and member of Blue Rodeo
 Dako, Del (1972) jazz musician
 DuBois, Mark (1972) opera singer
 Gibson, Dan  (1940) creator of Solitudes
 Gooderham, Albert Edward (1879) founder of the Canadian Academy of Music (later the Royal Conservatory of Music) and president of the Toronto Symphony Orchestra
 Hewitt, Bill (1949) broadcasting mogul and Hockey Night in Canada announcer
 Hewitt, Foster  (1921) broadcaster and Hockey Hall of Fame inductee
 Hodgson, Jay (1995) music critic, EMI Records recording artist and songwriter, and winner of the gold Governor General's Academic Medal
 Khemani, Rohin (1995) director of jazz and world music at the Youth Symphony for the United Nations
 MacDermot, Galt (1942) Grammy Award-winning musician and co-author of the Broadway musical Hair
 McFee, Allan (1931) CBC radio broadcaster and announcer for the Royal Canadian Air Farce
 McNaught, John (c. 1920) Canadian radio broadcaster and writer

Visual media
 Band, Charles Shaw  (c. 1903) philanthropist, art collector, and twice President of the Art Gallery of Ontario
 Bassett, Douglas  (1958) member of the Canadian Association of Broadcasters Hall of Fame, president of the CTV Television Network, and founder of CFTO-TV
 Beaubien, François de Gaspé (1981) co-owner of Telemedia Corp. and president of the Canadian Magazine Publishers' Association
 Brooks, Daniel (1976) playwright and winner of the first Siminovitch Prize in Theatre, awarded in 2001
 Burke, Edmund W. (1891) architect of Prince Edward Viaduct and the Simpson's (now Hudson's Bay Company) flagship store in Toronto
 Campbell, Nicholas (1970) filmmaker and actor, Canadian film and television
 Clark, Tom (1971) television journalist, anchorman, and CTV Washington Bureau chief
 Daly, Thomas C.  (1936) National Film Board of Canada leader and Oscar-winning film producer.
 Darling, Frank  (1859) architect of the Centre Block on Parliament Hill, Convocation Hall, and Trinity College, and winner of the Royal Gold Medal
 Davies, Geraint Wyn (1975) actor
 Deeks, Jim (1967) – television journalist and political advisor
 Dick, Leonard (1982) – Emmy Award, Golden Globe, and Writers Guild Award-winning producer and writer of Lost, House, and many sitcoms
 Doherty, Brian (1922) founder of the Shaw Festival
 Douglas, Melvyn (1913) Academy Award-winning actor
 Dunn, Barrie (1971) - Co-creator, writer, producer Trailer Park Boys (Left school in April, 1970) https://archive.org/details/collegetimes1970uppe
 Eckler, Greg (1987) Canadian Screen Award-winning writer, The Rick Mercer Report
 Felix, Enrique Alvarez (1954) Mexican actor
 Flaherty, Robert (1903) pioneer of documentary films, including Nanook of the North
 Fraser, Brendan (1987) Academy Award-winning actor (left school in final year)
 Gelber, Arthur  (1934) founder of the Ontario Arts Council and chairman of National Arts Centre
 Gilday, Leonard (1967) producer of The Nature of Things and for the National Geographic Channel
 Graham, Patrick W. (1984) journalist for Harper's and the New York Times Magazine; television correspondent for the Canadian Broadcasting Corporation
 Grier, Sir Edmund Wyly (1877) Portraitist and president of the Royal Canadian Academy of Arts
 Guerrero, Phil (1987) YTV PJ (did not graduate)
 Hendrie, W. Brett (1997) – Director, Strategic Events, Rotman School of Management (since 2021), formerly Hot Docs Canadian International Documentary Festival, Executive Director
 Kane, Paul (1830) painter of the Canadian north and other pioneer landscapes
 Koffman, Jeffrey (1977) Emmy Award-winning journalist; ABC news anchor and bureau chief
 Law, Charles Anthony  (1935) official war artist
 Lewis, Avi (c. 1986) journalist and television host
 MacMillan, Michael  Academy Award winner;  CEO of Alliance Atlantis
 Massey, Raymond Hart (1910) actor and Hollywood Walk of Fame inductee
 Massey, Walter (c. 1945) actor, voice of Principal Heney on Arthur
 Massry, Hartland (1935) architect of Innis College and master planner of Carleton University
 Mettler, Peter Genie, National Film Board of Canada, and other awards-winning writer and director
 Moore, James Mavor  (1929) founding head of the Guild of Canadian Playwrights and founder of St. Lawrence Centre for the Arts
 Pettler, Levi founder of Ontario Arts Council and the National Arts Centre
 Snow, Michael  (1948) multimedia modern artist
 Sultanov, Sanzhar (2007)  film producer and director
 Taché, Eugène-Étienne   (1849) architect of the Assemblée nationale du Québec building, designer of Québec's Coat of Arms, and author of the province's motto Je me souviens
 Wachter, Charles (1993) Emmy Award-winning executive producer of Jamie Oliver's Food Revolution
 Watier, Martin (1992) – actor and specialist in dubbing

Business
 Alexander, Richard Henry  founder and President of the Vancouver Board of Trade, founder of the Vancouver Club, and Commodore of the Royal Vancouver Yacht Club
 Beatty, David Ross  (1959) – international business expert, diplomat, and chairman of the Board of Governors of Upper Canada College
 Beatty, William Henry – Director of Gooderham & Worts, vice-president Canada's first trust company, and President of the Bank of Toronto
 Black, Montegu – Controller of Hollinger Inc. and director of the Toronto-Dominion Bank
 Caldwell, Theo (1991) – President of Caldwell Asset Management, journalist, and radio commentator
 Cameron, Alexander – businessman and founder of Essex, Ontario
 Cheesbrough, Gordon – chairman and chief executive officer of Altamira and chairman of the Board of Governors of Upper Canada College
 Cumming, James (1861) – chief fur trader for the Hudson's Bay Company
 Davidson, Richard – President of Brewers Retail Inc.
 Eaton, Fred (1982) – catamaran designer and winner of the International Catamaran Challenge Trophy
 Eaton, George – chief executive officer of the T. Eaton Company
 Eaton, Sir John Craig (c. 1894) – chairman and chief executive officer of the T. Eaton Company
 Eaton, John Craig  – chairman and chief executive officer of the T. Eaton Company and Chancellor of Ryerson University
 Eaton, Timothy (c. 1852) – founder of the now-defunct Eaton's department store
 Facy, Christopher - Founder of Hidden Gem Clothing
 Fejér, Bela (1963) – developer, including Bank Centre and Four Seasons Hotel in Budapest
 Gentles, Roy A. – chairman and chief executive officer of Alcan
 Gillespie, Ian A. – chairman and chief executive officer of the Export Development Corporation
 Gooderham, William George (1867) – owner of Gooderham Worts Distilleries and president of the Bank of Toronto
 Gould, Stephen A. – Vice-president of American Express
 Grafstein, Laurence S. – managing director of Lazard
 Hill, Craig M.D. - MBA Candidate at Schulich School of Business
 Hiller, Robert W. – President and chief financial officer of the Campbell Soup Company
 Ho, Lawrence – chairman and chief executive officer of Melco International
 Hutcheson, Blake (1980) – President and CEO of Oxford Properties
 Macaulay, Hugh – chairman and chief executive officer of the Canadian Tire Corporation
 Meredith, Gregory P. – chairman and chief executive officer of HSBC (US)
 Pellatt, Sir Henry  – Major General, financier, and builder of Casa Loma
 Phelan, Paul D. – Vice Chairman of the Board and chairman of the executive committee of Cara Operations Limited
 Prichard, Robert  – chief executive officer of Torstar and president of the University of Toronto
 Rogers, Ted  (c. 1951) – Canada's ninth wealthiest man, chairman of Rogers Communications, full owner of the Toronto Blue Jays, and eponym of the Rogers Centre
 Tapscott, Alex (2004) – Business author, investor, and blockchain and cryptocurrency expert
 Szaky, Tom (2001) – co-founder of TerraCycle
 Thomson, David, 3rd Baron Thomson of Fleet (c. 1975) – Canada's wealthiest man, sixth wealthiest in the world, and Chairman of Thomson Corporation
 Thompson, John M.  Chairman of International Business Machines Corporation
 Thomson, Kenneth, 2nd Baron Thomson of Fleet (c. 1941)  formerly Canada's wealthiest man; Chairman of Thomson Corporation
 Weston, Galen  (c. 1958) – Canada's second wealthiest man and Chairman of the George Weston Limited
 Weston, Galen Jr. (1993)  executive chairman of Loblaw Companies
 Weston, George  founder of George Weston Limited
 Wright, Timothy Rogers  President of GlaxoSmithKline

Educators
 Barrett, Anthony (1964) founder of Pollution Probe (Canada's first environmental advocacy organisation); Chancellor of the University of Toronto
 Best, Henry B.M. (1952) Knight Italian Order of Merit; president of Laurentian University
 Connell, George  (1947) President of the University of Toronto and the University of Western Ontario; director of Allelix Biopharmaceuticals
 Cowan, John Scott Principal of the Royal Military College of Canada
 Crean, John Gale (1928) founder of the Ontario Science Centre; first Canadian director of the International Chamber of Commerce
 Dale, Williams (c. 1866) educationalist; mayor of St. Mary's, Ontario
 Eaton, Fred  (1957) High Commissioner to the United Kingdom; Chancellor of the University of New Brunswick
 Grier, Terry (1953) Member of Parliament and president of Ryerson University
 Lafferty, Alfred (1855) Upper Canada College's first black student; headmaster of the Guelph Collegiate Vocational Institute
Merritt, Thomas Rodman (c. 1842) Member of Parliament; founder and president of Ridley College
 Prichard, Robert  (1967) President of the University of Toronto and president of Star Media Group
 Ridpath, John (c. 1954) Objectivist philosopher and retired York University associate Professor of Economics and Intellectual History
Wright, Rodger CN (1970) Headmaster, Trinity College School (1983-2004); Headmaster, Collingwood School (2004–present)

Humanitarians
 Barrett, Anthony (1964) founder of Pollution Probe; Chief Financial Officer of the World Wildlife Fund of Canada
 Barton, Eric  (1957) founder of a leprosy treatment centre in India; principal of UCC
 Conacher, Duff (1982) founder of Democracy Watch; best-selling author
 Dalglish, Peter (1976) founder of Street Kids International; recipient of the Outstanding Young Persons of the World award, imprisoned in Nepal for child molestation
 Douglas, Ian  founding president of the Canadian Epilepsy Association; chairman of the National Board of Governors of the Canadian Corps of Commissionaires
 Druckman, Miles (1982) founder of SOS International; named a "Global Leader of Tomorrow" by the World Economic Forum
 Woods, Ian (1968) social activist and publisher

Legal
 Armour, John Douglas  (c. 1848) chief justice of Ontario; justice of the Supreme Court of Canada
 Biggar, Oliver Mowat (1894) Canada's first chief electoral officer; chief Canadian legal advisor to the Treaty of Versailles
 Boyd, Sir John Alexander  (c. 1855) Chancellor of the Court of Chancery; president of the High Court of Ontario
 Burns, Robert Easton  Puisne judge of the Court of Queen's Bench, Chancellor of the University of Toronto, and Treasurer of the Law Society of Upper Canada
 Cameron, John Hillyard  (1833) Member of Parliament, co-founder of the Canada Life Assurance Company, and solicitor general of Upper Canada
 Cameron, Sir Matthew Crooks (1838) Chief Justice of Ontario and Father of Confederation
 Cartwright, John Robert  (1912) Chief Justice of Canada
 Cross, Charles Wilson  first Attorney-General of Alberta; member of the Legislative Assembly of Alberta and of the Canadian House of Commons
 Ewart, J. S.  (c. 1867) advocate of Canadian independence
 Harlan, John Marshall II  (1911) Associate Justice of the United States Supreme Court
 Howland, William (1932) Chief Justice of Ontario; treasurer of the Law Society of Upper Canada
Hughes, Samuel , a judge of the Supreme Court of Ontario and Chairman of the Hughes Inquiry
 Jaffer, Jameel (1990)  human rights and civil liberties attorney, Deputy Legal Director of the American Civil Liberties Union, and Director of the ACLU's Center for Democracy
 Macleod, James Farquharson (1848) Colonel, pioneer of Alberta and third Commissioner of the Royal Canadian Mounted Police
 McMurtry, Roy (c. 1950) Chief Justice of the Ontario Superior Court of Justice and High Commissioner to the United Kingdom
 Moss, Thomas (1854) Chief Justice of Ontario
 Robinson, Christopher (c. 1846) Attorney General of Canada
 Wallbridge, Lewis  (c. 1834) Chief Justice of Manitoba, speaker of the Legislative Assembly of the Province of Canada, and director of the Bank of Upper Canada

Medicine
 Bethune, Norman Sr.  (c. 1840) Canadian doctor; father of Norman Bethune
 Burgess, Thomas Joseph Workman  (1866)  leader in psychiatry in Canada; President of the Société Médico-Psychologique de Québec and American Medico-Psychological Association (later the American Psychiatric Association)
 Mack, Theophilus  leader in obstetrics and gynaecology; founder of St. Catharines General Hospital
 McCulloch, Ernest  Lasker Award winner accredited with the discovery of the stem cell; Canadian Medical Hall of Fame inductee
 Montizambert, Frederick (1859) developer of Canadian quarantine stations, first director general of public health, and a Canadian Medical Hall of Fame inductee
 Qaadri, Shafiq (1982) University of Toronto graduate, medical journalist, and Ontario Member of Provincial Parliament
 Rao, Vivek youngest cardiac surgeon and head of heart transplant programme at Toronto General Hospital
 Robertson, Lawrence Bruce (1902) introduced blood transfusions for children at the Hospital for Sick Children

Military service
 Boulton, Charles Arkoll (c. 1859) leader of the militant opposition against the rebellion led by Louis Riel; later a Canadian Senator
 Cockburn, Hampden Zane Churchill  (1881) recipient of the Victoria Cross
 Cowan, John Scott Principal of the Royal Military College of Canada
 Crerar, Henry Duncan Graham  HDG (1904) General, Chief of the General Staff, and Commander of the First Canadian Army
 Denison, George Taylor II  Colonel, supporter of the early Canadian militia, and commander during the Fenian Raids
 Denison, George Taylor III   lawyer, commander of the Governor General's Body Guard, founder of the Canada First movement and the British Empire League, and military historian
 Dunkelman, Ben (1930) Israeli war hero
 Dunn, Alexander Roberts  (1844) first recipient of the Victoria Cross
 Geary, George Reginald  (c. 1891) Lt. Colonel, cabinet minister, commander of the Royal Grenadier Regiment, and mayor of Toronto
 Gressett, Sir Arthur Edward  Lieutenant-General in the British Army
 Gordon, James Neil , Brigadier General, as a Major he commanded a company of The Queen's Own Rifles of Canada on D-Day landing at Juno Beach, later becoming Commanding Officer of The North Shore (New Brunswick) Regiment for the remainder of the war, and post war Commanding Officer and then Honorary Colonel of The Queen's Own Rifles.
 Little, Charles Herbert  (1926) Director of naval intelligence during the Second World War
 Matthews, Albert Bruce  Major General, Commander of the II Canadian Corps
 Pettler, Levi  Major General, acclaimed war hero, and commander of the Royal Engineers
 Williams, David Russell (1982) former Canadian Forces Air Command colonel, commander of CFB Trenton, and convicted murderer

State affairs, diplomacy, and politics

Ambassadors, high commissioners, and diplomats
 Campbell, Arthur Grant
 Crean, Gordon Gale (1932)  Ambassador to Yugoslavia, West Germany, and the Vatican Ecumenical Council
 Eaton, Fredrik Stefan   Canadian High Commissioner to the United Kingdom
 George, James   (1936)  Canadian ambassador to Iran, high commissioner to India, and world renowned activist
 Graham, John (1952)  diplomat to Cuba, Central Intelligence Agency spy, and first Head of the Organization of American States
 McCordick, John Alexander (1933)  Canadian Ambassador to Austria and representative to the International Atomic Energy Agency
 Smith, Arnold Cantwell  (1932)  Canadian ambassador to Moscow and Cambodia, and secretary-general of the Commonwealth Secretariat
 Wilson, Michael  (1955)  minister of finance, chairman and chief executive officer of UBS AG, chancellor of the University of Trinity College, and Canadian ambassador to the United States
 Wrong, Hume (1909)  Canadian ambassador to Washington and part author of the North Atlantic Treaty

Parliamentarians
 Bosley, John William  (1964) Speaker of the House of Commons of Canada
 Boulton, D'Arcy (c. 1843)  Member of the Legislative Assembly of Ontario; Grandmaster of the Grand Black Chapter of British America
 Bristol, Edmund James   Member of the Canadian House of Commons and minister without portfolio in the federal Cabinet
 Cameron, John Hillyard (c. 1835) Conservative member of the House of Commons of Canada and solicitor general for Upper Canada
 Cartwright, Matt Member of the United States House of Representatives
 Cassidy, Michael (1954) Member of the Legislative Assembly of Ontario, member of the Canadian parliament and leader of the Ontario New Democratic Party
 Cockburn, James  (1833) Father of Confederation and the first Speaker of the House of Commons of Canada
 Crooks, Adam  (1846) Member of the Legislative Assembly of Ontario and first Ontario minister of education
 Dunlop, Edward (1937) founding chairman of the Toronto Sun; member of the Ontario legislature
 Harrison, Alexander Robert  (c. 1851) Conservative member of the first Canadian parliament
 Heap, Dan (1943) New Democratic Party member of parliament
 Ignatieff, Michael  (1965) former leader of the Liberal Party of Canada and Her Majesty's Loyal Opposition, noted historian and journalist
 Kelly, Norm (c. 1959) Member of Parliament, Toronto city councillor, Deputy Mayor of Toronto
 Lang, Dan led by Louis Riel; later a Canadian senator
 Lubbock, Eric, 4th Baron Avebury (c. 1946) Member of the House of Lords and member of the Liberal Democrats foreign affairs team
 Macaughton, Alan  (1921) former Speaker of Parliament and Canadian senator
 McDonald, Donald (1830)  Member of the Legislative Council of the Province of Canada, Liberal Senator, and vice-president of the Royal Canadian Bank
 Merritt, Thomas Rodman (c. 1842) Member of the House of Commons of Canada and vice-president of the Imperial Bank of Canada
 Saxton, Andrew (1982) Conservative member of parliament, Parliamentary Secretary to the Minister of Finance and businessman
 Sheard, Charles – Chief Medical Officer of Toronto, Chairman of the Ontario Board of Health, and Member of Parliament
 Small, James Edward – Member of the Legislative Assembly of Upper Canada and Legislative Assembly of the Province of Canada and Solicitor General of Canada West
 Wrzesnewskyj, Borys (c. 1978) Member of the Canadian Parliament; owner of Future Bakery restaurants

Premiers and mayors
 Allan, George William  (1835) Mayor of Toronto and Canadian senator
 Beaven, Robert (1844) Premier of British Columbia
 Blake, Edward  (1850) Premier of Ontario, federal Cabinet minister, member of the Canadian parliament, member of the British parliament
 Bowlby, Ward Hamilton   Reeve of Berlin, Ontario (now known as Kitchener), barrister, director of the Economical Fire Insurance Company
 Chisholm, George King  first Mayor of Oakville and Sergeant-at-Arms for the Legislative Assembly of the Province of Canada
 Coleman, Michael Mayor of Duncan, British Columbia and president of the Federation of Canadian Municipalities
 Drew, George  (1913) Premier of Ontario and Canadian High Commissioner to the United Kingdom
 Howland, Oliver (1863) Member of the Ontario parliament and Mayor of Toronto
 Hoyles, Newman Wright  third Premier of Newfoundland Colony and member of the colonial legislative assembly
 Lamport, Allan  (1923) Mayor of Toronto
 Tonks, Alan (1959) Member of Parliament and Mayor of Toronto

Ministers and advisors
 Agnew, John Hume (c. 1881) Manitoba Cabinet minister
 Beatty, Perrin  (1968) Cabinet minister, president of the Canadian Broadcasting Corporation, and Chancellor of the University of Ontario Institute of Technology
 Cameron, Matthew Crooks  (1838) Cabinet member of premier John Sandfield Macdonald and provincial secretary and registrar of Ontario
 Daly, Thomas Mayne   Minister of the Interior, Superintendent-General of Indian Affairs, and Minister of Justice and Attorney General of Canada
 Gelber, Lionel (1926) advisor to Prime Minister John Diefenbaker, and founder of the Lionel Gelber Prize
 Godfrey, John  (1961) Canadian minister of state for infrastructure and communities, and editor of the Financial Post
 Gordon, Walter L.  (1922) Canadian minister of finance and chancellor of York University
 Graham, Bill  (1957) former Liberal Party Member of Parliament and Foreign Affairs Minister
 Hughes, Sir Samuel  (c. 1871) Canadian minister of militia during World War I
 Ibbs, Sir Robin  (1942) Chairman of Lloyd's Bank and senior advisor to British Prime Minister Margaret Thatcher
 Marling, Alexander  Deputy Minister of Education for Ontario
 O'Reilly, John (1953)  Chief Meteorologist of Ontario
 Rossi, Rocco (1981) national director of the Liberal Party of Canada, advisor to Liberal leader Michael Ignatieff, businessman

Viceroys
 Aikins, James Albert Manning (1871) founder of the Canadian Bar Association, member of the Canadian parliament, and Lieutenant Governor of Manitoba
 Aird, John Black  (1941) founder of Aird & Berlis LLP and Lieutenant Governor of Ontario
 Hendrie, Sir John Strathearn  (1874) Lieutenant Governor of Ontario
 Jackman, Henry  (1950) Chief executive officer of the National Trust and Empire Life Insurance, and Lieutenant Governor of Ontario
 Robinson, John Beverley  (1836) President of the Queen's Privy Council for Canada, mayor of Toronto, and Lieutenant Governor of Ontario
 Tupper, William Johnston (c. 1880) Lieutenant Governor of Manitoba

Religion
 Hutchison, Andrew (1956) Primate of the Anglican Church of Canada
 McLeod, Bruce (1946) Moderator of the United Church of Canada and president of the Canadian Council of Churches

Sports
 Ballard, Harold (c. 1921) owner of the Toronto Maple Leafs, Hamilton Tiger-Cats, and Maple Leaf Gardens, and Hockey Hall of Fame inductee
 Barry, Michael   (1993) professional cyclist and member of Lance Armstrong's Discovery Channel Pro Cycling Team
 Beare, John (1992) 2008 Olympic bronze medallist in the Men's Four
 Brown, Sir George McLaren (1880) member of the International Olympic Committee
 Cohon, Mark director of corporate and game development for Major League Baseball International, National Basketball Association vice-president of business development, and chair of the Ontario Science Centre
 Conacher, Brian (1961) member of the 1967 Stanley Cup Toronto Maple Leafs and the 1964 Olympic Canadian hockey team
 Elder, James  (1953) 1956 and 1968 Olympics equestrian gold medallist
 Elkinson, Kilian (2008) member of the Toronto FC
 Evans, Michael (1984) 1984 Olympics men's eight gold medallist and chairman of Goldman Sachs Asia
Faust, Andre (c. 1987) member of the Philadelphia Flyers
 Greening, Colin (2005) member of the Toronto Maple Leafs
 Irwin, Brayden (c. 2004)  former member of the Toronto Maple Leafs
 Kerr, John (1970) 1984 Olympics sailing bronze medallist
 Lang, Stuart (1970) member of the Canadian Football League Edmonton Eskimos and winner of four Grey Cups
 Mara, George  (1941) Captain of the 1948 Olympic gold medal-winning Canadian hockey team, director of Maple Leaf Gardens, and Canada's Sports Hall of Fame inductee
 McKee, Mike  member of the Quebec Nordiques
 Meredith, Greg  Member of the Calgary Flames
 O'Connor, Matt (2010) member of the Ottawa Senators
 Edward Ogden (1876) first-class cricketer
 Peckover, Doug (1969) 1997 Laser Master World Champion, 2006 Laser Grand Master World Champion
 Rumble, John Mitchell (1953) 1956 Olympics equestrian bronze medallist
 Smythe, Con (1909) owner of the Toronto Maple Leafs; founder of Maple Leaf Gardens; coach of the 1928 Winter Olympics gold medal-winning team; namesake of the NHL's Conn Smythe Trophy
 Sokolowski, Howard co-owner of the Toronto Argonauts
 Spencer, Vic founding director of the BC Lions, Canadian Football League Hall of Fame inductee, and Canadian Football League fullback, and founding partner and director of Delta Hotels
journal=Old Times| issue=Summer/Fall 2008| page=31| publisher=Upper Canada College| location=Toronto| year=2008}}</ref>
 Turner, Pat (1980) 1984 Olympics men's eight rowing gold medallist
 Williams, Barney (1996) 2004 Olympic games men's coxless four silver medallist
 Willson, Montgomery (1927) 1932 winter Olympics figure skating bronze medallist
 Wright, Tom E.S. (1971) Director of Operations for UFC Canada, former Commissioner of the Canadian Football League and former president of Adidas Canada

References

Lists of Canadian people by school affiliation
Upper Canada College alumni